Oshana is a surname. Notable people with the surname include:

Anwar Oshana (born 1972), Assyrian-American professional boxer 
Nancy Oshana Wehbe (born 1975), Assyrian-American bodybuilder
Vincent Oshana, American actor and comedian